Serino is a town and comune in the province of Avellino, Campania, southern Italy.

Serino is known for its production of chestnuts and  Aglianico wine.

It gave its name to the Roman Aqua Augusta aqueduct which it supplied.

Notable people
Sabato "Simon" Rodia (1879–1965), sculptor

Twin towns
 Baia Mare, Romania, since 2003

References

Cities and towns in Campania